Eastern Equatoria is a state in South Sudan. It has an area of 73,472 km². The capital is Torit. On October 1, 1972, the state was divided into Imatong and Namorunyang states and was re-established by a peace agreement signed on 22 February 2020.

Louis Lobong Lojore is the current governor of Eastern Equatoria.

Geography

The state shares international borders with Uganda in the south, with Kenya in the south-east and with Ethiopia in the north-east. Domestically, it is bordered by Central Equatoria in the west and Jonglei in the north. The Ilemi Triangle in the east, between Eastern Equatoria and Lake Turkana, is or has been disputed among all three abutting states (South Sudan, Kenya and Ethiopia).

Population

The state had 906,126 people in 2008 (32/sq mi).
Eastern Equatoria state was home to several different ethnic groups. 
The Toposa, Jie and Nyangathom live in the Kapeota counties in the east of the state. 
The Didinga, Dodoth and Boya live in Budi county around Chukudum. 
Further west, Lopa, Torit and Ikwoto counties are inhabited by the Ketebo, Otuho, Mokoyi Lopit, Lango, Pari, and Tenet people who inhabit a portion of the lopit hills after they split from Didinga and Murle early in the 19th century and Lokoya of Lowoi. 
The Acholi, Madi, Iwire and Ofiriha people live in the westernmost Magwi county.

Most of the inhabitants of Eastern Equatoria live by subsistence farming, and also raise cattle, sheep and goats. Some of the crops are sold, while most are consumed locally. The Didinga Hills in Budi county have rich and fertile soil that is used for cultivation of tobacco, potatoes, maize, and Dura.

Government

The executive head of the State was the Governor, who was elected. The Governor was appointing ministers, advisors, and the Executive Directors to the Counties. The Counties in turn, were ruled by the democratically elected Local Government Councils headed by the County Commissioner  The state legislature was elected, with the first elections being held in April 2010.

Administrative divisions

Eastern Equatoria, like other states in South Sudan, was sub-divided into counties. These were further divided into Payams, then Bomas. Each county was headed by a County Commissioner, elected by the people of a County as the head of the local government in the County.

Counties were originally larger, but were subdivided in part to ensure that the different communities have full representation. Thus Torit County was subdivided into Torit, Lopa and Ikwotos counties, and Greater Kapoeta was divided into Budi County and Kapoeta county, which in turn was divided into Kapoeta North, South and East counties.

Counties as of 2020 were:

 Budi County
 Ikotos County
 Kapoeta East County
 Kapoeta North County
 Kapoeta South County
 Lafon County
 Magwi County
 Torit County

Health 
, this was one of the last areas in the world where cases of Guinea worm disease are found, with twelve of the 17 reported cases occurring "in one small pocket of Eastern Equatoria State," according to NPR.

Governors

See also
 Government of Eastern Equatoria from 2010
 Government of Eastern Equatoria 2005–2010
 Equatoria
 Central Equatoria
 Western Equatoria

References

External links
 Equatorians Abroad
 Video of Equatorians Abroad

 
States of South Sudan